Harry G. Ewing (April 7, 1920 – January 25, 2019), better known as Mick Ewing, was an American football coach. Ewing was the head football coach at the University of Chicago. He held that position for five seasons, from 1983 until 1987. His coaching record at Chicago was 18–26. Ewing died on January 25, 2019, at the age of 98.

Head coaching record

References

1920 births
2019 deaths
Chicago Maroons football coaches
Illinois Wesleyan University alumni
Sportspeople from Aurora, Illinois